Jasem Al-Dowaila (born 9 March 1963) is a Kuwaiti hurdler. He competed in the 400 metres hurdles at the 1984 Summer Olympics and the 1988 Summer Olympics.

References

External links
 

1963 births
Living people
Athletes (track and field) at the 1984 Summer Olympics
Athletes (track and field) at the 1988 Summer Olympics
Kuwaiti male hurdlers
Olympic athletes of Kuwait
Place of birth missing (living people)
Asian Games medalists in athletics (track and field)
Asian Games bronze medalists for Kuwait
Athletes (track and field) at the 1986 Asian Games
Medalists at the 1986 Asian Games
20th-century Kuwaiti people
21st-century Kuwaiti people